Sir Roger Arthur Carver Norrington  (born 16 March 1934) is an English conductor. He is known for historically informed performances of Baroque, Classical and Romantic music.

In November 2021 Norrington announced his retirement.

Life 
Norrington is the son of Sir Arthur Norrington, and his brother is Humphrey Thomas Norrington. He studied at The Royal Conservatory of Music in Toronto, Dragon School, Oxford, Westminster School, Clare College, Cambridge and the Royal College of Music under Adrian Boult among others. Norrington played the violin, and worked as a tenor through the 1960s. In 1962 he founded the Schütz Choir (later the Schütz Choir of London).

Conductor in Britain and US 
From 1969 to 1984, Norrington was music director of Kent Opera. In 1978, he founded the London Classical Players and remained their musical director until 1997. From 1985 to 1989, he was principal conductor of the Bournemouth Sinfonietta. He is also president of the Oxford Bach Choir. In the US, from 1990 to 1994, he was music director of the Orchestra of St. Luke's.

With his wife, the choreographer Kay Lawrence, he formed in 1984 the Early Opera Project to complement his concert work in period-style opera, beginning with Claudio Monteverdi's L'Orfeo at the Maggio Musicale Fiorentino that year, and touring Britain in 1986.

From Salzburg to Stuttgart 
In Europe, he was principal conductor of the Camerata Salzburg from 1997 to 2006, and principal conductor of the Stuttgart Radio Symphony Orchestra from 1998 to 2011. On 28 July 2016, he conducted the final concert of the Stuttgart Radio Symphony Orchestra in London at the Royal Albert Hall as part of The Proms, before its scheduled merger with the SWR Sinfonieorchester Baden-Baden und Freiburg.

Other activities: Boston, Bremen, Zurich 
He was artistic advisor of the Boston Handel and Haydn Society from 2006 to 2009. He was principal guest conductor of the Orchestre de chambre de Paris and the Deutsche Kammerphilharmonie Bremen. He was principal conductor of the Zurich Chamber Orchestra from 2011 to 2016. He has conducted over 50 world premieres, and has appeared regularly with the Berlin Philharmonic, the Vienna Philharmonic, and major orchestras throughout the world.

Historically informed performance 
Norrington is best known for historically informed performances of Baroque, Classical and Romantic music. He is a member of the historically informed performance movement. Norrington has advocated a limited or no use of vibrato in orchestral performances, which has brought him both positive and adverse criticism. He has strictly followed Beethoven's original metronome markings in his symphonies, despite critical comment that these markings were "miscalculated". He has conducted recordings of Haydn, Mozart, Beethoven, Schubert, Berlioz, Brahms, Tchaikovsky, Dvorak, Bruckner, and Mahler on period and modern instruments. In particular, Norrington makes very sparse use of the vibrato, often uses very fast tempos, and varies the placement of the instruments on stage. Especially with the Stuttgart Radio Symphony Orchestra Norrington has developed a very individual sound, which is often dubbed by the trade press as Stuttgart Sound. This refers to the synthesis of historically informed music making with the means of a modern and flexible orchestra. Symphonic cycles which Norrington interpreted in recent years with the Stuttgart Radio Symphony Orchestra have received worldwide acclaim. 

There are critics among other musicians, on Norrington's performance practice; for example, the violist of the Melos Quartet, Hermann Voss, drew two tough caricatures to Norrington's vibrato-free string sound in 2005, adding: "Except for the Stuttgart Feuilleton, the New Stuttgart Style finds only contempt and scorn."

TV 
In August 2008, Norrington appeared in the reality TV talent show-themed television series, Maestro on BBC Two, when he led the judging panel. He conducted the First Night of the Proms in 2006 and the Last Night of The Proms on 13 September 2008.

Personal life 
Norrington has been married twice. He and his second wife, Kay Lawrence, have a son, Tom.

Awards and honours 
He was appointed OBE in 1980, CBE in 1990 and Knight Bachelor in 1997. He is a patron of Bampton Classical Opera and the Orchestra of St Paul's. He is an honorary fellow of Clare College Cambridge and holds honorary degrees from the Universities of York and Kent and an honorary doctorate from the Royal College of Music.

See also
 The Rossini Bicentennial Birthday Gala

References

External links
 A Norrington discography from the Japanese website "kanzaki.com"
 London Philharmonic Choir page
 Isobel Leybold-Johnson, "Sir Roger takes up the baton in Zurich".  Swiss Info webpage article, 10 September 2010
 Interview with Sir Roger Norrington, April 26, 1996

1934 births
Alumni of Clare College, Cambridge
Alumni of the Royal College of Music
British performers of early music
Commanders of the Order of the British Empire
Recipients of the Order of Merit of Baden-Württemberg
Officers Crosses of the Order of Merit of the Federal Republic of Germany
English conductors (music)
British male conductors (music)
20th-century British conductors (music)
21st-century British conductors (music)
Grammy Award winners
Honorary Members of the Royal Academy of Music
Knights Bachelor
Conductors (music) awarded knighthoods
Living people
People educated at The Dragon School
People educated at Westminster School, London
20th-century English musicians
20th-century British male musicians
21st-century British male musicians
21st-century English musicians